TS4 may refer to:

 The Sims 4, a 2014 simulation video game
 Toy Story 4, a 2019 American film